Carlo De Benedetti (born 14 November 1934) is an Italian industrialist, engineer, and publisher. He is both an Italian and naturalized Swiss citizen. He was awarded the Order of Merit for Labour by the Italian state in 1983, the Medaglia d'oro ai benemeriti della cultura e dell'arte (gold medal of culture and art) and the Legion d'Honneur in 1987.

De Benedetti is chairman of the Rodolfo De Benedetti Foundation (Fondazione Rodolfo Debenedetti) in Milan, which he founded in 1998 in memory of his father. It promotes research into economic policy decisions regarding the labor market and welfare systems in Europe. In 2020, De Benedetti spent 10 million euros setting up Domani, a new liberal newspaper headquartered in Rome. He is married to the former actress Silvia Monti.

Life and career
Born into a wealthy Jewish family, on 14 November 1934, Carlo De Benedetti is the brother of Italian Senator Franco Debenedetti, whose surname is different owing to a spelling error. In 1943, during the World War II, the De Benedetti family fled to Switzerland. After Carlo returned to Italy, he received a degree in electrical engineering from the Polytechnic University of Turin and in 1959 began to work in his father's manufacturing business, the Compagnia Italiana Tubi Metallici Flessibili. He helped improve company profits consistently and in 1972 acquired the Gilardini company, of which he became president and CEO until 1976.
Carlo De Benedetti left Italy to return to Switzerland in 1975, owing to possible terrorist threats during the Anni di Piombo period of Italian domestic terrorism.

For a brief period, from 4 May to 25 August 1976, he was appointed CEO of FIAT. His resignation from Fiat was caused, according to De Benedetti, by his decision to lay off 65,000 workers, which was refused by Fiat head Gianni Agnelli; other sources say that he was suspected of trying to build up a takeover of power within the company, with the backing Swiss financial groups.

In November 1976, De Benedetti acquired the CIR Group, thereby also obtaining control of the national newspaper La Repubblica and the newsmagazine L'Espresso. In 1978 he became CEO of the Italian manufacturer Olivetti, where he remained until his resignation in 1996. As president of Olivetti, since 1983, he quickly and ruthlessly reorganized the company, switching its focus from mechanical typewriters to computers.

In the 1980s, along with other leading business figures, he founded the European Round Table of Industrialists, of which he was vice president until 2004. In 1985 he became a member of the European Advisory Committee of the New York Stock Exchange.

In 1995 De Benedetti founded the telecommunications companies Omnitel and Infostrada.

In 1997 he created the Gruppo Editoriale L'Espresso (L'Espresso Editorial Group), by merging the L'Espresso and La Repubblica editorial groups. Carlo Caracciolo was appointed president of the group. However, Carlo De Benedetti assumed the presidency in 2006, after the death of Caracciolo. On 26 January 2009, at a press conference, De Benedetti announced his decision to retire from all his executive positions in the CIR group, keeping only - at the request of the Board of Directors - the position of Chairman of the Espresso Group. All the executive positions in the CIR group were given to the current Chief Executive, Rodolfo De Benedetti.

SME affair
In 1985, Romano Prodi, then president of the state-owned IRI (Institute for Industrial Reconstruction), tried to sell the IRI share in SME (a former state-owned agency, later turned food industry conglomerate) to De Benedetti, who was then president of Buitoni (a food industry belonging to the CIR group), for Lit.497 billion. Other offers for SME included most notably one for a joint venture with Fininvest, a media group owned by entrepreneur and future Italian prime minister Silvio Berlusconi. The sale to De Benedetti was later blocked by the then Italian prime minister Bettino Craxi, and SME remained state-owned until almost 10 years later.

De Benedetti brought IRI to court in an attempt to appeal the block, but the court, presided over by judge Filippo Verde, denied his case in 1986. In 1995, Silvio Berlusconi, Cesare Previti and Attilio Pacifico were accused of having bribed Filippo Verde and Renato Squillante to fix the trial against De Benedetti. Berlusconi was later acquitted.

According to Der Spiegel on 7 June 2011, Berlusconi was found guilty of bribery and ordered to pay €560 million to CIR.

Tangentopoli
In 1993, during the Mani Pulite (Clean Hands) political-corruption investigations, Carlo De Benedetti was arrested and  admitted to having paid a Lit.10 billion bribe to government parties, to obtain a purchase order from the Italian Postal Service for obsolete teleprinters and computers. In May of that year, he was officially put under investigation, but De Benedetti never went to trial for this episode, the statute of limitations having expired.

Banco Ambrosiano
De Benedetti became deputy chairman of the Italian bank Banco Ambrosiano in 1981, by acquiring 2% of the capital, but left after only 61 days. In April 1992, Carlo De Benedetti and 32 other people were convicted of fraud by a Milan court in connection with the collapse of the bank. Benedetti was sentenced to six years and four months in prison, but the sentence was overturned in April 1998, by the Court of Cassation.

Media businesses 
De Benedetti once controlled the La Repubblica, Italy's main left-leaning newspaper; L'Espresso, a major news magazine; and La Stampa, a newspaper published out of Turin. In 2012, he handed control of his family media company to his sons, who later sold it to the Agnelli-Elkann family against his wishes. In 2020, he founded Domani, a daily newspaper, to service liberal readers. The newspaper's ownership will eventually be transferred to a non-profit foundation.

Politics
Carlo De Benedetti has often been identified with Italian centre left politics. He has a long-standing feud with Silvio Berlusconi, and he once controlled the main centre-left-leaning Italian newspaper (La Repubblica) and newsmagazine (L'Espresso). He has been called a "foe of Berlusconi" by The Wall Street Journal.

In October 2005, De Benedetti reportedly offered Benjamin Netanyahu, then the Finance Minister of Israel, the position of Italian finance minister, which Netanyahu declined. De Benedetti later said it had been a joke. Ehud Gol, the Israeli ambassador to Italy, had introduced the men.

Honours
1983: Knight of the Order of Merit for Labour
1987: Italian Order of Merit for Culture and Art Golden medal
1987: Officer of the Legion of Honour
1987: Member of the Royal Swedish Academy of Engineering Sciences
2006: Decoration of Honour for Services to the Republic of Austria Silver medal

References

External links

Italian publishers (people)
Olivetti people
Recipients of the Order of Merit for Labour
Recipients of the Italian Order of Merit for Culture and Art
Officiers of the Légion d'honneur
Recipients of the Medal for Services to the Republic of Austria
Carlo
Members of the Royal Swedish Academy of Engineering Sciences
20th-century Italian Jews
1934 births
Living people
Fiat people
La Repubblica people